Edith Sitzmann (born 4 January 1963, Regensburg) is a German politician of the Alliance 90/The Greens party served as State Minister of Finance in the second cabinet of Minister-President Winfried Kretschmann of Baden-Württemberg from 2017 to 2021. From 2011 to 2016, she led the Green Party's Group in the State Parliament.

Early life and education
Sitzmann was born on 4 January 1963 in Regensburg. She studied the humanities at the University of Freiburg, University of Regensburg, and Heidelberg University. Sitzmann earned a magister degree in 1989, then began working until 1991 as a tour guide for American exchange students.

Political career
Sitzmann joined the Alliance 90/The Greens party. From 1993 to 2001, she was a personal friend of and adviser to Dieter Salomon, a member of the Landtag of Baden-Württemberg. From 1994, she also worked as a freelance presenter and consultant for non-profit organizations until 2001, when she started her own business. In that time, Sitzmann also joined the district board of Alliance 90/The Greens from 1993 to 1994, and then the party's state board from 1995 to 1999.

In May 2016, Sitzmann was appointed State Minister of Finance for Baden-Württemberg. She announced in 2020 that she would not stand for reelection in the 2021 state elections.

Other activities

Corporate boards
 EnBW, Ex-Officio Member of the Board of Supervisory Directors (2017–2021)
 KfW, Ex-Officio Member of the Board of Supervisory Directors (2017–2021)
 Landesbank Baden-Württemberg (LBBW), Ex-Officio Member of the Board of Supervisory Directors (2017–2021)

Non-profit organizations
 German Federation for the Environment and Nature Conservation (BUND)
 Nature and Biodiversity Conservation Union (NABU), Member

Citations

Living people
1963 births
People from Regensburg
Alliance 90/The Greens politicians
Members of the Landtag of Baden-Württemberg